The Suzhou massacre was an incident involving the Huai Army led by Li Hongzhang in Suzhou. The Taiping Army 200,000 surrendered to Li Hongzhang in December 1863, but Li ordered the deaths of 10,000 POWs on the Temple of Two Towers (Luohan Twin Towers) in Suzhou.

See also
Charles George Gordon
Cheng Xuechi
The Warlords
Tan SauGuan

References
Draft History of Qing

Massacres in 1863
Military history of the Qing dynasty
19th-century military history of China
Massacres in China
History of Jiangsu
1863 in China
1863 in military history
December 1863 events
Prisoner of war massacres
Taiping Rebellion
1863 disasters in China